Hughesville Junior Senior High School is located at 349 Cemetery Street, Hughesville, Lycoming County, Pennsylvania. It is the sole high school operated by East Lycoming School District. The school serves the Boroughs of Hughesville and Picture Rocks and Franklin Township, Jordan Township, Mill Creek Township, Moreland Township, Penn Township, Shrewsbury Township and Wolf Township in Lycoming County, Pennsylvania. The school is not a federally designated Title I school.

In 2015, there were 748 pupils in 7th through 12th grades. The school employed 50 teachers.

Extracurriculars
East Lycoming School District offers a wide variety of clubs, activities and an extensive sports program.

Sports
The district funds:

Boys
Baseball
Basketball
Cross country
Football
Golf
Indoor track and field
Soccer
Tennis
Track and field
Wrestling

Girls
Basketball
Cheerleading
Cross country
Golf
Indoor track and field
Soccer
Softball
Tennis
Track and field

Junior high school sports

Boys
Basketball
Football
Soccer
Wrestling 

Girls
Basketball
Soccer
Softball

According to PIAA directory July 2013

References

Schools in Lycoming County, Pennsylvania
Public high schools in Pennsylvania